The 2021 Americas Challenge is a curling challenge that took place from October 29 to 31 at Lacombe Curling Club in Lacombe, Alberta. The challenge was used to determine the second team from the Americas Zone to qualify for the 2022 World Men's Curling Championship, as the United States already qualifies as the host nation. It is the second time Canada has participated in the challenge, with their first being in 2018 where they defeated Brazil 3–0 in the best-of-five series. No women's challenge was held.

Background
The World Curling Federation allots two men's and two women's spots for the Americas Zone at the World Curling Championships. For the 2022 Championships, the United States has automatically claimed the first slot, due to being the host country of the event.

Mexico and Brazil challenged Canada, who would have otherwise qualified automatically due to their finish at the 2021 World Men's Curling Championship. This is the eighth men's challenge to be held, but only the second where Canada was challenged. The winning team earns the second Americas Zone slot at the World Championships and the runner-up earns the one Americas Zone slot at the 2022 World Qualification Event, giving them another attempt to qualify for the Championships.

Teams
The teams are listed as follows:

Standings
Final Standings

Results
All draw times are listed in Mountain Daylight Time (UTC−06:00).

Draw 1
Friday, October 29, 19:00

Draw 2
Saturday, October 30, 9:00

Draw 3
Saturday, October 30, 14:00

Draw 4
Saturday, October 30, 19:00

Draw 5
Sunday, October 31, 9:00

Draw 6
Sunday, October 31, 14:00

References

Americas Challenge
2021 in Canadian curling
Curling in Alberta
Americas Challenge
Sports competitions in Alberta
Americas Challenge
International curling competitions hosted by Canada
Americas Challenge
Lacombe, Alberta